The Buccaneer 240 and Buccaneer 245 are a family of American trailerable sailboats that were both designed as cruisers and first built in 1975.

Production
The designs were built by Bayliner Marine Corp. in the United States, between 1975 and 1979, but are now out of production.

Design
McArthur says that the boats are Bayliner developments of Alan Payne's Columbia T-23, adapted from a "splashed" mold using a T-23 hull. Henkel claims that the designs are a scaled down version of William Garden's Buccaneer 300, created by Bayliner's in-house design team.

The design goals were outlined by Bayliner as a roomy, trailerable, cruising-oriented sailboat with six feet of below deck headroom.

The Buccaneer 240 and 245 are recreational keelboats, built predominantly of fiberglass, with wood trim. They have masthead sloop rigs, raked stems, plumb transoms, transom-hung rudders controlled by tillers and fixed, shallow draft, long keels.

The design has sleeping accommodation for four people, with a double "V"-berth in the bow cabin and an aft cabin with a double berth. The galley is located on the port side at the companionway ladder. The galley is equipped with a two-burner stove and a double sink. The large head is located beside the companionway on the starboard side, has  of headroom and includes a shower. The number of the ports was not consistent through the production run of the boat.

Variants
Buccaneer 240
This outboard motor-equipped model was introduced in 1975. The boat is fitted with a small  outboard motor for docking and maneuvering.
Buccaneer 245
This inboard diesel engine-equipped model was introduced in 1975. The boat is fitted with a small Volvo  inboard motor for docking and maneuvering.

Operational history
In a 2010 review Steve Henkel described the boat as a "floating apartment for coasting downwind. He wrote, "the Buccaneer Design Team ... created a group of high, boxy looking "wedding cake" designs with keels too shallow and with too little ballast for good upwind performance. Best features: Very extensive accommodations, with double berth aft, V-berth forward, convertible dinette in a "lounge" area that doesn't need to be made up every morning, a huge "bathroom" with head, sink, and shower, galley with a "refrigerator" (actually, just an icebox?), stove, and two-basin sink, Oh, and there's 6-foot headroom too. Worst features: The penalty for the good living arrangements below is a boat that sails downwind satisfactorily, but is no good upwind."

See also
List of sailing boat types

References

Keelboats
1970s sailboat type designs
Sailing yachts
Trailer sailers
Sailboat type designs by Alan Payne
Sailboat types built by Buccaneer Yachts